The Pelecaniformes  are an order of medium-sized and large waterbirds found worldwide. As traditionally—but erroneously—defined, they encompass all birds that have feet with all four toes webbed. Hence, they were formerly also known by such names as totipalmates or steganopodes. Most have a bare throat patch (gular patch), and the nostrils have evolved into dysfunctional slits, forcing them to breathe through their mouths. They also have a pectinate nail on their longest toe. This is shaped like a comb and is used to brush out and separate their feathers. They feed on fish, squid, or similar marine life. Nesting is colonial, but individual birds are monogamous. The young are altricial, hatching from the egg helpless and naked in most. They lack a brood patch.

The pelicans, shoebill and hamerkop form a clade within the order, with their next closest relatives being a clade containing the herons, ibises and spoonbills. The Fregatidae (frigatebirds), Sulidae (gannets and boobies), Phalacrocoracidae (cormorants and shags), Anhingidae (darters), and Phaethontidae (tropicbirds) were traditionally placed in the Pelecaniformes, but molecular and morphological studies indicate they are not such close relatives. They have been placed in their own orders, Suliformes and Phaethontiformes, respectively.

Systematics and evolution
Classically, bird relationships were based solely on morphological characteristics. The Pelecaniformes were traditionally, but erroneously, defined as birds that have feet with all four toes webbed (totipalmate), as opposed to all other birds with webbed feet where only three of four were webbed. Hence, they were formerly also known by such names as totipalmates or steganopodes. The group included frigatebirds, gannets, cormorants, anhingas, and tropicbirds.

Sibley and Ahlquist's landmark DNA-DNA hybridisation studies (see Sibley-Ahlquist taxonomy) led to them placing the families traditionally contained within the Pelecaniformes together with the grebes, cormorants, ibises and spoonbills, New World vultures, storks, penguins, albatrosses, petrels, and loons together as a subgroup within a greatly expanded order Ciconiiformes, a radical move which by now has been all but rejected: their "Ciconiiformes" merely assembled all early advanced land- and seabirds for which their research technique delivered insufficient phylogenetic resolution.

Morphological study has suggested pelicans are sister to a gannet-cormorant clade, yet genetic analysis groups them with the hamerkop and shoebill, though the exact relationship between the three is unclear. Mounting evidence pointed to the shoebill as a close relative of pelicans. This also included microscopic analysis of eggshell structure by Konstantin Mikhailov in 1995, who found that the shells of pelecaniform eggs (including those of the shoebill but not the tropicbirds) were covered in a thick microglobular material. Reviewing genetic evidence to date, Cracraft and colleagues surmised that pelicans were sister to the shoebill with the hamerkop as the next earlier offshoot. Ericson and colleagues sampled five nuclear genes in a 2006 study spanning the breadth of bird lineages, and came up with pelicans, shoebill and hamerkop in a clade. Hackett and colleagues sampled 32 kilobases of nuclear DNA and recovered shoebill and hamerkop as sister taxa, pelicans sister to them, and herons and ibises as sister groups to each other with this heron and ibis group a sister to the pelican/shoebill/hamerkop clade.

The current International Ornithological Committee classification has pelicans grouped with the shoebill (Balaenicipitidae), hamerkop (Scopidae), ibises and spoonbills (Threskiornithidae), and herons, egrets and bitterns (Ardeidae). The phylogenetic relationships between the families is shown in the following cladogram:

Recent research strongly suggests that the similarities between the Pelecaniformes as traditionally defined are the result of convergent evolution rather than common descent, and that the group is paraphyletic. All families in the traditional or revised Pelecaniformes except the Phalacrocoracidae have only a few handfuls of species at most, but many were more numerous in the Early Neogene. Fossil genera and species are discussed in the respective family or genus accounts; one little-known prehistoric Pelecaniforms, however, cannot be classified accurately enough to assign them to a family. This is "Sula" ronzoni from Early Oligocene rocks at Ronzon, France, which was initially believed to be a sea-duck and possibly is an ancestral Pelecaniform.

The pelecaniform lineages appear to have originated around the end of the Cretaceous. Monophyletic or not, they appear to belong to a close-knit group of "higher waterbirds" which also includes groups such as penguins and Procellariiformes. Quite a lot of fossil bones from around the Cretaceous–Paleogene boundary cannot be firmly placed with any of these orders and rather combine traits of several of them. This is, of course, only to be expected, if the theory that most if not all of these "higher waterbird" lineages originated around that time is correct. Of those apparently basal taxa, the following show some similarities to the traditional Pelecaniformes:

 Lonchodytes (Lance Creek Late Cretaceous of Wyoming, US)
 Torotix (Late Cretaceous)
 Tytthostonyx (Late Cretaceous/Early Palaeocene)
 Cladornis (Deseado Early Oligocene of Patagonia, Argentina)
 "Liptornis"—a nomen dubium

The proposed Elopterygidae—supposedly a family of Cretaceous Pelecaniformes—are neither monophyletic nor does Elopteryx appear to be a modern bird.

References

Further reading
 Bourdon, Estelle; Bouya, Baâdi & Iarochene, Mohamed (2005): Earliest African neornithine bird: A new species of Prophaethontidae (Aves) from the Paleocene of Morocco. J. Vertebr. Paleontol. 25(1): 157–170. DOI: 10.1671/0272-4634(2005)025[0157:EANBAN]2.0.CO;2 HTML abstract
 Mayr, Gerald (2003): The phylogenetic affinities of the Shoebill (Balaeniceps rex). Journal für Ornithologie 144(2): 157–175. [English with German abstract] HTML abstract
 Mortimer, Michael (2004): The Theropod Database: Phylogeny of taxa. Retrieved 2013-MAR-02.

External links

 Tree of Life: Pelecaniformes

 
Seabirds
Bird orders
Extant Paleogene first appearances
Taxa named by Richard Bowdler Sharpe